Lover Come Back may refer to:
Lover Come Back, 1940 novel by Clair Blank
Lover Come Back (1931 film), starring Constance Cummings
New Moon (1940 film), a musical also known as Lover Come Back, featuring Jeanette MacDonald and Nelson Eddy
Lover Come Back (1946 film), featuring George Brent and Lucille Ball
Lover Come Back (1961 film), starring Doris Day and Rock Hudson
"Lover Come Back" (song), a song by City and Colour

See also
 Louvre Come Back to Me!, a 1962 Looney Tunes cartoon directed by Chuck Jones featuring Pepé Le Pew
"Lover, Come Back to Me", a song written by Sigmund Romberg with lyrics by Oscar Hammerstein II for the 1927 Broadway show The New Moon, also sung in the 1940 film
"Lover Come Back to Me" (Dead or Alive song), a 1985 single